Colparion is a genus of minute, air-breathing land snails, terrestrial pulmonate gastropod mollusks or micromollusks in the family Urocyclidae.

Species
Species within the genus Colparion include:
 Colparion madgei Laidlaw, 1938

References

 Laidlaw, F. F. (1938). A new genus and species of the Ariophantidae from the Island of Rodriguez. Bulletin of the Mauritius Institute. 1(3): 9-12
 Bank, R. A. (2017). Classification of the Recent terrestrial Gastropoda of the World. Last update: July 16th, 2017

 
Urocyclidae
Taxonomy articles created by Polbot